The 2016–17 Little Rock Trojans men's basketball team represented the University of Arkansas at Little Rock during the 2016–17 NCAA Division I men's basketball season. The Trojans, led by first-year head coach Wes Flanigan, played their home games at the Jack Stephens Center in Little Rock, Arkansas as members of the Sun Belt Conference. They finished the season 15–17, 6–12 in Sun Belt play to finish in tenth place. They lost in the first round of the Sun Belt tournament to Louisiana–Lafayette.

Previous season
The Trojans finished the 2015–16 season 30–5, 17–3 in Sun Belt play to win the Sun Belt regular season championship. They defeated Louisiana–Lafayette and Louisiana–Monroe to win the Sun Belt tournament. As a result, the Trojans received the conference's automatic bid to the NCAA tournament as a No. 12 seed. In the First Round, they upset Purdue before losing in the second round to Iowa State.

Following the season, first-year head coach Chris Beard left the school to accept the head coaching position at UNLV. On March 31, 2016, the school hired Wes Flanigan as head coach.

Roster

Schedule and results

 
|-
!colspan=9 style=| Non-conference regular season

|-
!colspan=9 style=| Sun Belt Conference regular season

|-
!colspan=9 style=| Sun Belt tournament

References

Little Rock
Little Rock Trojans men's basketball seasons
TRoj
TRoj